Mansour Mohamed El-Kikhia (born 28 November 1936) is a Libyan academic and politician. El-Kikhia is a former member of the Libyan National Transitional Council as a city representative for Benghazi. He is an alumnus of the University of Provence, from where he received a PhD in Population Geography with Distinction in 1986. El-Kikhia is well known in Benghazi for his role with the Public Scout and Girl Guide Movement of Libya; he was awarded the Bronze Wolf, the only distinction of the World Organization of the Scout Movement in 1981.

References

Living people
Members of the National Transitional Council
People from Benghazi
University of Provence alumni
1936 births
Recipients of the Bronze Wolf Award
Scouting and Guiding in Libya